Glumaceae is a descriptive botanical name. It was used in the Bentham & Hooker system (volume of 1883) for the order including the grass family: 
 order Glumaceae
 family Eriocauleae
 family Centrolepideae
 family Restionaceae
 family Cyperaceae
 family Gramineae (Poaceae)
The APG II system places the plants involved (and many others) in the order Poales. Other names for the order including the grass family are Glumiflorae and Graminales.

References

Historically recognized angiosperm taxa